Papaioea is a suburb of Palmerston North on New Zealand's North Island.

Its name comes from the name of the original settlement in a clearing in forest which was purchased from local Māori (Ngāti Rangitāne) in 1864. The name was used to describe Palmerston North also. Somewhat later, the name had become forgotten with the transliteration of Pamutana being preferred (especially by the Native Land Court).

The name Papaioea did not resurface until the 1920s, and is sometimes used to refer to Palmerston North as a whole.

Papaioea has many shops, food outlets and supermarkets, including Terrace End Shopping Centre (Broadtop) on Broadway Avenue. There are real estate agencies, a veterinarian clinic, medical clinics and several churches, including Broadway Methodist Church.

Aorangi Hospital, formerly known as Mercy Hospital, was a private hospital in the northwest of the suburb. It has since been demolished, with services moved to Crest Hospital in nearby Carroll Street. The site is now occupied by Broadway Radiology who occupy a new, modern building.

Horizons Regional Council office is also located in Papaioea.

Papaioea Park is located in the north of the suburb. It is used as a football ground and cricket ground by lower club grades, and is walled on the Featherston Street and Ruahine Street boundary.

Palmerston North Borough Council decided to reserve land for the park in the 1920s They chose the name Papaioea to commemorate the original settlement in the area. There was a spelling mistake and the name was spelt "Papaeoia". This was not corrected until the 1970s.

The first stage of a new social housing development opened in the area in 2019. Palmerston North City Council applied for Government funding for a second stage of the project during the coronavirus pandemic in 2020.

The Palmerston North Hospital area is identified as a separate area by Statistics New Zealand. On the southern side of Tremaine Avenue is a predominantly suburban area, with tree lined streets and avenues. The north side of Tremaine Avenue is dominated by commercial and industrial businesses. Features in the area include Arohanui Hospice, the Northern Bowling Club, Rimu Lodge Rest Home, Willard Rest Home, and Wahikoa Park.

Demographics

It had a population of 7,020 at the 2018 New Zealand census, an increase of 441 people (6.7%) since the 2013 census, and an increase of 237 people (3.5%) since the 2006 census. There were 2,913 households. There were 3,348 males and 3,678 females, giving a sex ratio of 0.91 males per female, with 1,107 people (15.8%) aged under 15 years, 1,842 (26.2%) aged 15 to 29, 2,838 (40.4%) aged 30 to 64, and 1,236 (17.6%) aged 65 or older.

Ethnicities were 74.2% European/Pākehā, 15.5% Māori, 3.4% Pacific peoples, 16.1% Asian, and 2.9% other ethnicities (totals add to more than 100% since people could identify with multiple ethnicities).

The proportion of people born overseas was 23.2%, compared with 27.1% nationally.

Although some people objected to giving their religion, 47.0% had no religion, 36.0% were Christian, 2.5% were Hindu, 2.0% were Muslim, 1.2% were Buddhist and 4.0% had other religions.

Of those at least 15 years old, 1,500 (25.4%) people had a bachelor or higher degree, and 1,011 (17.1%) people had no formal qualifications. The employment status of those at least 15 was that 2,667 (45.1%) people were employed full-time, 831 (14.1%) were part-time, and 306 (5.2%) were unemployed.

Education

Palmerston North Boys' High School and Queen Elizabeth College are also located in the area.

References

Suburbs of Palmerston North